Haji Fazlur Rehman  is an Indian politician who has been a Member of Lok Sabha for Saharanpur since 2019.

Personal life
Rehman graduated from the Aligarh Muslim University in 1972. His family are major beef exporters in Uttar Pradesh.

Political career
On 27 February 2019, Mahagathbandhan, the grand alliance of Samajwadi Party, Bahujan Samaj Party and Rashtriya Lok Dal announced that Rehman would contest the upcoming 2019 Indian general election from Saharanpur constituency on the symbol of Bahujan Samaj Party. On 23 May 2019, Rehman was elected to the Lok Sabha after defeating Raghav Lakhanpal of Bharatiya Janata Party, his nearest rival by a margin of 22,417 votes. Rehman polled 5,14,139 votes.

References

Living people
Bahujan Samaj Party politicians
India MPs 2019–present
1951 births